Filip Mitrovic a.k.a. The Elkcloner is a Serbian-American composer and producer from Los Angeles, California. In 2012, he was nominated for Daytime Emmy Award in the category Outstanding Achievement in Music Direction and Composition for a Drama Series,  and in 2015, Mitrovic was nominated for Latin Grammy Award for Album of the Year.  Mitrovic's music was premiered at Carnegie Hall in 2010.

Early life
Mitrovic was born in Belgrade, Serbia. Since his father was a musician and producer as well, Mitrovic grew up surrounded by music. He began playing guitar at age 8 and was soon immersed in the musical world. In 2000, Mitrovic took advantage of a full scholarship at Chicago College of Performing Arts in Chicago, Illinois, to study Music Composition & Orchestration. After graduating, Mitrovic moved to New York City to work for the film music collective tomandandy, where he contributed his original music to many Hollywood blockbusters and TV commercials. He later worked as an assistant to Angelo Badalamenti.

Film & TV Scoring Career

After venturing out on his own, Mitrovic collaborated with Jon Batiste and The Blue Man Group to create the opening credits theme music for George Lopez's blockbuster Spare Parts (Lionsgate), starring Marisa Tomei and Jamie Lee Curtis. He then created the main titles theme music for Netflix original series Four Seasons in Havana. These two engagements led Mitrovic to scoring numerous films and TV shows, including the Hollywood feature Manhattan Undying (Paramount Pictures), Donald Glover's Guava Island documentary series about Cuban prodigy musicians, and Marija Stojnic's Speak So I Can See You (Doc Fortnight, Museum of Modern Art, NYC).

Tuney

In 2019, Mitrovic co-founded Tuney, an AI-assisted, auto-score-to-picture music platform for content creators. In 2020, the company joined MuckerLab, a startup accelerator in Santa Monica.

Ear Candy Shop

In 2015, Filip Mitrovic and Antony Demekhin founded Ear Candy Shop, a boutique music production house for advertising, providing music for TV campaigns. Clients include TED (conference), Maker's Mark, Facebook, Hennessy, American Eagle and others.

Dark Bardo

In 2021, Mitrovic partnered up with producer Andy Baldwin to create Dark Bardo, a music production duo inspired by a mysterious package from an anonymous sender that contained a plastic sherrif's badge, a Cuban cigar, and a copy of Illusions: The Adventures of a Reluctant Messiah, a novel by Richard Bach. The first double single is set to release in 2022, featuring the artists Shungudzo and Nini Fabi (Haerts).

Films

References 

Living people
American people of Serbian descent
American male composers
21st-century American composers
Musicians from Brooklyn
Daytime Emmy Award winners
1979 births
21st-century American male musicians